Dickey is a Scottish surname, nickname, and given name. It may refer to:

People with the surname 
 Annamary Dickey (1911–1999}. American actress
 Basil Dickey (1880–1958), American screenwriter
 Bill Dickey (1907–1993), American baseball player and manager
 Bronwen Dickey (born 1981), American writer and journalist
 Charles William Dickey (1871–1942), American architect
 Christopher Dickey (1951–2020) American writer
 Dale Dickey (born 1961), American actress
 Darrell Dickey (born 1959), American football coach and former player
 Daryl Dickey (born 1961), American football administrator, former coach, and former player
 Derrek Dickey (1951–2000), American basketball player and sportscaster
 Dick Dickey (1926–2006), American basketball player
 Donald Ryder Dickey (1887–1932) American animal photographer, ornithologist and mammalogist
 Doug Dickey (born 1932), American former football player, coach and athletics administrator
 Eldridge Dickey (1945–2000), American football player
 E.M.O'R. Dickey (1894–1977), Irish wood engraver and arts administrator
 Eric Jerome Dickey (1961–2021), African-American novelist and comedian
 George Dickey (disambiguation)
 James Dickey (disambiguation)
 Jay Dickey  (1939–2017), American politician
 Jesse Column Dickey, US Congressman
 Jim Dickey (born 1934), American former football player and coach, father of Darrell Dickey
 John Dickey (disambiguation)
 Lucinda Dickey (born 1960), American dancer and actress
 Lynn Dickey (born 1949), American former football player
 R. A. Dickey (born 1974), American baseball pitcher
 Robert J. Dickey, American businessman
 Theophilus Lyle Dickey (1811–1885), American lawyer, jurist and American Civil War Union Army colonel
 Whit Dickey (born 1954), American jazz drummer
 William Dickey (disambiguation)

People with the nickname 

 Dickey Betts (born 1943), American guitarist
 Dickey Chapelle (1919–1965), American photojournalist and war correspondent
 Dickey Kerr (1893–1963), American Major League Baseball pitcher
 Dickey Lee (born 1936), American pop/country singer and songwriter
 Dickey Pearce (1836–1908), American baseball player, a pioneer of the shortstop position and possibly one of the first professionals
 Dickey Simpkins (born 1973), American former National Basketball Association player

People with the given name 

 Dickey Nutt (born 1959), American college basketball coach

See also 

 Justice Dickey (disambiguation)
 Dicky (name)
 Dickie (name)

Lists of people by nickname